Robert Hines (born March 28, 1961, in Philadelphia, Pennsylvania), was a professional boxer in the Light Middleweight (154lb) division.

Boxing career
Known as "Bam Bam", Hines turned pro in 1981 and won the IBF Light Middleweight Title with a decision win over Matthew Hilton in 1988. He lost the belt in his first defense to Darrin Van Horn. He currently works as a trainer at the James Shuler Boxing Gym in Philadelphia. Rob also works as a trainer at 9Rounds off of City Line Ave.

Professional boxing record

|-
|align="center" colspan=8|25 Wins (17 knockouts, 8 decisions), 3 Losses (2 knockouts, 1 decision), 1 Draw, 1 No Contest
|-
| align="center" style="border-style: none none solid solid; background: #e3e3e3"|Result
| align="center" style="border-style: none none solid solid; background: #e3e3e3"|Record
| align="center" style="border-style: none none solid solid; background: #e3e3e3"|Opponent
| align="center" style="border-style: none none solid solid; background: #e3e3e3"|Type
| align="center" style="border-style: none none solid solid; background: #e3e3e3"|Round
| align="center" style="border-style: none none solid solid; background: #e3e3e3"|Date
| align="center" style="border-style: none none solid solid; background: #e3e3e3"|Location
| align="center" style="border-style: none none solid solid; background: #e3e3e3"|Notes
|-align=center
|Loss
|25–3–1 
|align=left| Brett Lally
|TKO
|4
|25/06/1990
|align=left| Harrah's Marina, Atlantic City, New Jersey
|align=left|
|-
|Win
|25–2–1 
|align=left| Salim Muhammad
|TKO
|2
|20/11/1989
|align=left| Pennsylvania Hall, Philadelphia, Pennsylvania
|align=left|
|-
|Loss
|24–2–1 
|align=left| Darrin Van Horn
|UD
|12
|05/02/1989
|align=left| Trump Castle, Atlantic City, New Jersey
|align=left|
|-
|Win
|24–1–1 
|align=left| Matthew Hilton
|UD
|12
|04/11/1988
|align=left| Las Vegas Hilton, Las Vegas, Nevada
|align=left|
|-
|Win
|23–1–1 
|align=left| Jose Laercio Bezerra de Lima
|TKO
|3
|16/08/1988
|align=left| Philadelphia Armory, Philadelphia, Pennsylvania
|align=left|
|-
|Win
|22–1–1 
|align=left| Steve "Lightning" Little
|UD
|12
|21/04/1988
|align=left| Resorts Casino Hotel, Atlantic City, New Jersey
|align=left|
|-
|Win
|21–1–1 
|align=left| Tony Montgomery
|TKO
|10
|23/10/1987
|align=left| Resorts Casino Hotel, Atlantic City, New Jersey
|align=left|
|-
|style="background:#ddd;"|
|20–1–1 
|align=left| Donald Bowers
|NC
|2
|18/08/1987
|align=left| The Blue Horizon, Philadelphia, Pennsylvania
|
|-
|Win
|20–1–1
|align=left| Anthony Wiley
|TKO
|5
|01/06/1987
|align=left| Pennsylvania Hall, Philadelphia, Pennsylvania
|
|-
|Win
|19–1–1
|align=left| Ismael Negron
|KO
|7
|31/03/1987
|align=left| The Blue Horizon, Philadelphia, Pennsylvania
|
|-
|Draw
|18–1–1
|align=left| James Green
|PTS
|10
|01/07/1985
|align=left| The Sands, Atlantic City, New Jersey
|
|-
|Win
|18–1
|align=left| Kevin Howard
|UD
|10
|07/04/1985
|align=left| The Sands, Atlantic City, New Jersey
|
|-
|Loss
|17–1
|align=left| Ricardo Bryant
|TKO
|7
|27/06/1994
|align=left| The Sands, Atlantic City, New Jersey
|
|-
|Win
|17–0
|align=left| Dennis Fain
|KO
|2
|30/05/1984
|align=left| Atlantic City, New Jersey
|align=left|
|-
|Win
|16–0
|align=left| Ramon Gaspar Abeldano
|TKO
|7
|22/01/1984
|align=left| The Sands, Atlantic City, New Jersey
|align=left|
|-
|Win
|15–0
|align=left| Lanny Edmonds
|KO
|7
|17/09/1983
|align=left| The Sands, Atlantic City, New Jersey
|align=left|
|-
|Win
|14–0
|align=left| Jake Torrance
|PTS
|8
|14/07/1983
|align=left| Ice World, Totowa, New Jersey
|align=left|
|-
|Win
|13–0
|align=left| Eddie Campbell
|KO
|3
|26/05/1983
|align=left| The Sands, Atlantic City, New Jersey
|align=left|
|-
|Win
|12–0
|align=left| JJ Cottrell
|PTS
|8
|19/02/1983
|align=left| Las Vegas, Nevada
|align=left|
|-
|Win
|11–0
|align=left| Richard House
|KO
|2
|13/11/1982
|align=left| The Sands, Atlantic City, New Jersey
|
|-
|Win
|10–0
|align=left| Luis Mateo
|KO
|4
|17/10/1982
|align=left| The Claridge, Atlantic City, New Jersey
|align=left|
|-
|Win
|9–0
|align=left| Tommy May
|KO
|4
|25/09/1982
|align=left| Great Gorge Playboy Club, McAfee, New Jersey
|align=left|
|-
|Win
|8–0
|align=left| Sammy Rookard
|KO
|1
|19/07/1983
|align=left| Bally's Park Place, Atlantic City, New Jersey
|align=left|
|-
|Win
|7–0
|align=left| Billy Hodge
|KO
|1
|24/06/1982
|align=left| Resorts Casino Hotel, Atlantic City, New Jersey
|align=left|
|-
|Win
|6–0
|align=left| Larry Fleming
|PTS
|6
|02/03/1982
|align=left| The Tropicana, Atlantic City, New Jersey
|align=left|
|-
|Win
|5–0
|align=left| Teddy White
|PTS
|6
|22/12/1981
|align=left| Atlantic City, New Jersey
|align=left|
|-
|Win
|4–0
|align=left| Rocky Balboa
|KO
|1
|07/11/1981
|align=left| The Hacienda, Las Vegas, Nevada
|align=left|
|-
|Win
|3–0
|align=left| Jose Green
|KO
|2
|17/09/1981
|align=left| Atlantic City, New Jersey
|align=left|
|-
|Win
|2–0
|align=left| Ira Robinson
|TKO
|2
|30/07/1981
|align=left| Martin Luther King Arena, Philadelphia, Pennsylvania
|align=left|
|-
|Win
|1–0
|align=left| Ira Robinson
|PTS
|4
|08/03/1981
|align=left| Resorts Casino Hotel, Atlantic City, New Jersey
|align=left|
|}

See also 
 List of IBF world champions
 List of super welterweight boxing champions

References 

|-

  

1961 births
Boxers from New York City
International Boxing Federation champions
Living people
Sportspeople from Manhattan
American male boxers
Light-middleweight boxers